Pachytodes erraticus , or Judolia erratica, is a species of beetle in the family Cerambycidae. It was described by Dalman in 1817. Their body length ranges from 7 - 12mm. They live in underground parts of deciduous trees

References

Lepturinae
Beetles described in 1817